Margarella antarctica is a species of sea snail, a marine gastropod mollusk in the family Calliostomatidae, the top snails.

Distribution
This marine species occurs off South Orkney Islands, South Shetland Islands; Antarctic Peninsula, Bellingshausen Sea

Description 
It is orange-yellow, with two pairs of cephalic tentacles with large black eyes.
The shell is small, and wider than it is high.
The orbicular, deeply umbilicated shell has an obtuse-conical shape. It contains four convex whorls, the last of which is adorned only by growth lines. The oblique aperture is sub-circular and pearly inside. In, adults its edges are joined by a callus . The operculum is polygyrous spiral. The color of the shell is bluish gray or greenish. The maximum recorded shell length is 12.5 mm.

Habitat 
Minimum recorded depth is 0 m. Maximum recorded depth is 24 m.

References

 Zelaya D.G. (2004) The genus Margarella Thiele, 1893 (Gastropoda: Trochidae) in the southwestern Atlantic Ocean. The Nautilus 118(3): 112–120
 Engl W. (2012) Shells of Antarctica. Hackenheim: Conchbooks. 402 pp

External links
 

antarctica
Gastropods described in 1905